U Street is a rapid transit station on the Green and Yellow Lines of the Washington Metro in the U Street neighborhood of Washington, D.C.

U Street station is located in northwest Washington and serves the U Street neighborhood; nearby attractions include the Lincoln Theatre, the historic restaurant Ben's Chili Bowl, and several nightclubs, including The Black Cat and the 9:30 Club. The station is approximately five blocks east of the neighborhood of Adams Morgan.

Station layout

U Street station has a single island platform with entrances at either end, leading from U Street at 10th and 13th Streets. Like nearly all non-interchange stations on the Metro, there are two tracks: trains using track E1 head to Greenbelt (Green & Yellow Lines), while those on E2 are bound for Branch Avenue (Green) or Huntington (Yellow). This station was among the last to feature the 22-coffer "waffle" ceiling vault design.

History
Plans for rapid transit prior to the creation of WMATA in February 1967 focused on the needs of commuters while neglecting some of the District's less affluent neighborhoods. Riots following the assassination of Martin Luther King Jr. in 1968 destroyed much of the commercial district around 14th and U Streets and planners hoped that adding a subway stop in that area would stimulate redevelopment. The original 1969 plan called for a line under 13th Street NW with just two stations. However, in 1970, the District of Columbia Council agreed to pay an additional $3 million to add a third station and reroute the Green Line under U Street, and then 14th Street NW. Instead of opening in 1976, the first Green Line stations, including U Street, opened in 1991.

Trains originally serviced this station as Yellow Line trains until Green Line service was formally introduced later that year. Yellow Line service resumed in late 2006 as part of what was initially an 18-month experiment to extend that line to Fort Totten station during non-rush hours and weekends.

On June 10, 2001, Metro Transit Police Officer Marlon C. Morales was killed in the line of duty at this station, while intervening in a fare dispute. A plaque exists outside the 13th Street entrance in his honor.

"Cardozo" was added to the name just before opening, and refers to the nearby Cardozo High School. "African-Amer Civil War Memorial" was added in 1999 when the African American Civil War Memorial was completed at U Street and Vermont Ave NW. On November 3, 2011, the station was renamed to "U Street" with "African American Civil War Memorial / Cardozo" as a subtitle.

Notable places nearby
 African American Civil War Memorial
 Ben's Chili Bowl
 The Black Cat
 Lincoln Theatre
 Meridian Hill Park
 9:30 Club

References

External links

 The Schumin Web Transit Center: U Street Station
 10th Street entrance from Google Maps Street View
 13th Street entrance from Google Maps Street View

Stations on the Green Line (Washington Metro)
Washington Metro stations in Washington, D.C.
Stations on the Yellow Line (Washington Metro)
Railway stations in the United States opened in 1991
1991 establishments in Washington, D.C.
Railway stations located underground in Washington, D.C.
U Street Corridor, Washington, D.C.